Miss Universe 2018 was the 67th Miss Universe pageant, held at the IMPACT Arena, Muang Thong Thani, Nonthaburi Province, Thailand on December 17, 2018. 

At the end of the event, Demi-Leigh Nel-Peters of South Africa crowned Catriona Gray of the Philippines as Miss Universe 2018. It is the Philippines' fourth victory after their recent victory in 2015.

The pageant was hosted by Steve Harvey in his fourth consecutive year, with supermodel Ashley Graham. Television personality Carson Kressley and runway coach Lu Sierra provided commentary and analysis throughout the event. American singer-songwriter Ne-Yo performed in this year's pageant.

Background

Location and date

The Miss Universe Organization was in talks to host the Miss Universe 2018 competition in China. Negotiations collapsed after the Chinese refused to broadcast the pageant live, due to a huge time difference between China and the United States. Afterward, the Miss Universe Organization opened negotiations with the Philippines after they had previously hosted 2016.

In April 2018, then-Secretary of Tourism Wanda Tulfo-Teo spoke with President of the Philippines Rodrigo Duterte regarding the possibility of hosting the pageant in Boracay in November 2018, which will be newly rehabilitated by then after being closed to tourists for six months. On 6 May 2018, Tulfo-Teo announced that the Philippines had a "90% chance" of hosting the pageant and also disclosed that the tourism department would be looking for sponsors since the LCS Holdings Inc. of Chavit Singson, the major sponsor of Miss Universe 2016, had declined to finance the 2018 pageant. On 18 May 2018, Tulfo-Teo's successor Bernadette Romulo-Puyat announced that the country dropped the hosting bid due to budget constraints and other concerns. Romulo-Puyat also pointed out that the Philippines had hosted the pageant recently, and had no reason to do so again so soon.

On July 31, 2018, it was announced by Miss Universe Organization President, Paula Shugart, in a live press conference at Bangkok Art and Culture Centre, that the 2018 pageant would be in Bangkok, Thailand on 17 December 2018. The city has hosted the Miss Universe pageant twice, in 1992 and 2005. Current Miss Universe Demi-Leigh Nel-Peters with Miss Universe 1965 Apasra Hongsakula and Miss Universe 2005 Natalie Glebova participated in the announcement. The national costume competition took place on 10 December 2018 at the Nong Nooch Tropical Garden in Pattaya, Thailand.

Selection of participants
Contestants from 94 countries and territories were selected to compete in the pageant. Nine of these delegates were appointees to their titles after being a runner-up of their national pageant or an audition process or other internal selection. 

Zoé Brunet, the first runner-up of Miss Belgium 2018, was appointed to represent Belgium after Angeline Flor Pua, Miss Belgium 2018, chose to compete in Miss World 2018. Eva Colas of France and Magdalena Swat are also appointees to their titles after their original titleholders, Miss France 2018 Maëva Coucke and Miss Polonia 2017 Agata Biernat are unable to compete because of commitments to Miss World 2018. Coucke and Pua competed in the pageant the following year.

The 2018 edition saw the debuts of Armenia, Kyrgyzstan, and Mongolia and the returns of Belize, Denmark, Greece, Hungary, Kenya, Kosovo, and Switzerland. Greece last competed in 2015, and the others in 2016. Austria, Ethiopia, Guyana, Iraq, Romania, Slovenia, Tanzania, and Trinidad and Tobago withdrew. Guyana was suspended from participating in Miss Universe due to a controversy involving "nasty emails" and "death threats" sent to the organization over a delegate issue in 2017. No license holder replaced the previous license holder, forcing the country to withdraw. Trinidad and Tobago withdrew after they announced that there would be no pageant held, despite Martrecia Alleyne having crowned as Miss Universe Trinidad and Tobago 2018 at their 2017 national pageant. Austria, Ethiopia, Iraq, Romania, Slovenia, and Tanzania withdrew after their respective organizations lost their Miss Universe license and failed to hold a national competition or designate a contestant. 

Marie Esther Bangura of Sierra Leone arrived in Bangkok after registrations had ended, and was unable to participate due to visa and logistical concerns. However, she was allowed to participate in the pageant's activites and watch the competition from the audience. She was also invited to compete in the next edition of the pageant.

Ángela Ponce of Spain is Miss Universe's first openly transgender delegate. Despite not making it to the top 20, Ponce was recognized by pageant organizers for her historical importance during the competition. The pageant rules were changed to allow transgender women to compete in 2012.

Results

Placements

Special awards

Pageant

Format
The number of semifinalists was increased to 20— the same number of semifinalists in 2006. The results of the preliminary competition— which was composed of the swimsuit and evening gown competition and closed-door interviews, determined the top 20 semifinalists. The continental format was retained, with five semifinalists from the Americas, Europe, Africa & Asia-Pacific, and wildcards coming from any continental region. The top 20 competed in the opening statement round, after which the judges narrowed down the semifinalists to 10, who then competed in both swimsuit and evening gown competitions. After the swimwear and evening gown competitions, the judges then selected the top five to compete in the preliminary question and answer round. After said segment, the judges selected the final three, who participated in the final word and final look portions.

Selection committee
The seven judges for both the preliminary competition and the final telecast were an all-female panel which included:
 Liliana Gil Valletta – businesswoman
 Janaye Ingram – political organizer and Miss New Jersey USA 2004
 Monique Lhuillier – fashion designer
 Michelle McLean – Miss Universe 1992 from Namibia
 Iman Oubou – scientist, entrepreneur, and medical missionary
 Bui Simon – Miss Universe 1988 from Thailand
 Richelle Singson-Michael – Filipino architect and businesswoman

Contestants
94 contestants competed for the title.

Notes

References

2018 beauty pageants
2018 in Thailand
Beauty pageants in Thailand
December 2018 events in Thailand
2018